Phiala cubicularis is a moth in the family Eupterotidae. It was described by Strand in 1911. It is found in the Democratic Republic of Congo and Tanzania.

References

Moths described in 1911
Eupterotinae